Fermy 2 sovkhoza Vodyanovsky is a rural locality (a settlement) in Verkhnevodyanskoye Rural Settlement, Staropoltavsky District, Volgograd Oblast, Russia. The population was 95 as of 2010. There are 3 streets.

Geography 
The settlement is located on the steppe, in the Transvolga region, 196 km east of Staraya Poltavka (the district's administrative centre) by road. Zaprudnoye is the nearest rural locality.

References 

Rural localities in Staropoltavsky District